Sandrine Dusang (born 23 March 1984 in Vichy) is a French football player currently playing for Juvisy of the Division 1 Féminine. Dusang plays as a defender and is a member of the France women's national football team making her debut in 2003.

Career
Dusang grew up in the city of Vichy and began her career  playing for FCF Nord Allier Yzeure. She was later selected to attend CNFE Clairefontaine, the women's section of the prestigious Clairefontaine academy. Following her stint there, she joined Olympique Lyonnais. Since 2003, Dusang has made over 120 appearances scoring 20 goals. She has helped Lyon win an impressive three consecutive D1 Féminine titles beginning with the 2007–08 season.

International career
Dusang made her international debut on 18 March 2003 in a 1–0 victory over Finland. She made her international major tournament debut after being selected to play in UEFA Women's Euro 2005. Dusang played in all three group stage matches as France failed to get through to the knockout rounds. Dusang scored her only international goal on 13 March 2005 against Finland in the 2005 edition of the Algarve Cup. France won the match 3–1.

Honours

Club 

Lyon
Division 1 Féminine (6): 2006–07, 2007–08, 2008–09, 2009–10, 2010–11, 2011–12
Challenge de France (2): 2007–08, 2011–12
UEFA Women's Champions League (2): 2010–11, 2011–12

External links
 
 
 France player profile 
 
 Player stats at footofeminin.fr 

1984 births
Living people
French women's footballers
France women's international footballers
People from Vichy
CNFE Clairefontaine players
Olympique Lyonnais Féminin players
Paris FC (women) players
Division 1 Féminine players
Women's association football defenders
Sportspeople from Allier
Footballers from Auvergne-Rhône-Alpes
21st-century French women